Paramysis intermedia is a species of shrimp in the family Mysidae. Its natural distribution is Ponto-Caspian, but it is also invasive species, e.g. on the Baltic coast of Estonia. It tolerates salinities between 0–12 ppt; it occurs in estuaries but does not penetrate very deep into rivers.

Paramysis intermedia measures  in length.

References

Mysida
Crustaceans of Asia
Crustaceans of Europe
Fauna of the Baltic Sea
Fauna of the Black Sea
Fauna of the Caspian Sea
Crustaceans described in 1882